Stephen R. Ucci (born November 6, 1971) is an American politician and a Democratic member of the Rhode Island House of Representatives representing District 42 since January 2005. He was elected to serve as the Senior Deputy Majority Leader in January 2019.

Education
Ucci graduated from Providence College and earned his JD from the New England School of Law.

Elections
2012 Ucci was unopposed for both the September 11, 2012 Democratic Primary, winning with 1,061 votes and the November 6, 2012 General election, winning with 4,790 votes.
2004 Ucci challenged District 42 incumbent Representative Mary Cerra in the three-way September 14, 2004 Democratic Primary, winning with 1,253 votes (49.5%) and won the November 2, 2004 General election with 4,184 votes (72.2%) against Republican nominee Diane Giarrusso.
2006 Ucci was challenged in the September 12, 2006 Democratic Primary, winning with 1,470 votes (63.5%) and was unopposed for the November 7, 2006 General election, winning with 4,979 votes.
2008 Ucci was unopposed for both the September 9, 2008 Democratic Primary, winning with 1,005 votes and the November 4, 2008 General election, winning with 4,821 votes.
2010 Ucci was unopposed in the September 23, 2010 Democratic Primary, winning with 1,803 votes and also won the November 2, 2010 General election with 4,068 votes.

References

External links
Official page at the Rhode Island General Assembly

Stephen Ucci at Ballotpedia
Stephen R. Ucci at the National Institute on Money in State Politics

Place of birth missing (living people)
1971 births
Living people
Democratic Party members of the Rhode Island House of Representatives
New England Law Boston alumni
People from Johnston, Rhode Island
Providence College alumni
21st-century American politicians